Toshiko Akiyoshi Trio is a jazz trio album recorded by pianist Toshiko Akiyoshi in 1983.  It was released on the Toshiba / EMI East World record label.  This recording is not to be confused with the 1956 Storyville recording The Toshiko Trio.

Track listing
LP side A
"Heartache" – 5:25  
"Nancy" – 6:38  
"Love is a Many Splendored Thing" – 5:50  
LP side B
"Feast in Milano" – 6:32  
"Come Sunday" – 4:08  
"Hey There" – 8:15

Personnel
Toshiko Akiyoshi – piano 
Gene Cherico – bass
Joey Baron – drums

References / External links
 Toshiba East World EWJ-90022, Toshiba East World TOCT-9731

Toshiko Akiyoshi albums
1983 albums